Twelve Tree Copse Cemetery is a Commonwealth War Graves Commission cemetery containing the remains of Allied troops who died during the Gallipoli campaign.

It also contains the Twelve Tree Copse (New Zealand) Memorial, one of four memorials on the peninsula which commemorate New Zealand soldiers killed at Gallipoli but whose graves are not known.  The 179 names on it record the names of soldiers killed outside of the ANZAC area.

The cemetery was constructed after the Armistice from graves brought in from isolated sites and small cemeteries dotted around the battlefield. Notable amongst these were Geoghan's Bluff Cemetery which contained 925 graves from the Battle of Gully Ravine which was fought in June–July 1915, Fir Tree Wood Cemetery and Clunes Vennel Cemetery which contained 522 graves.

Special memorials contain the names of 646 British soldiers, ten from New Zealanders and one from Australian buried in the cemetery but whose graves have not been identified.

Notable graves

One of the unidentified bodies is that of Second Lieutenant Alfred Smith who was killed when he flung himself onto a grenade to save his comrades, for which he was posthumously awarded a Victoria Cross.

References

External links
 

Commonwealth War Graves Commission cemeteries in Gallipoli